The 2020–21 Gibraltar Intermediate League is the third season of under-23 football in Gibraltar, after reforms to reserve team football in June 2018. The league will be contested by 10 teams - nine under-23 sides plus Hound Dogs, and began on 8 December 2020. Lincoln Red Imps are the reigning champions. The league was suspended from 17 December 2020 to 4 April 2021 due to the COVID-19 pandemic. As a result, when the league resumed play, the format of the league changed so that they would only play each other once.

Format
The Gibraltar Intermediate League was established by the Gibraltar Football Association in June 2018 as a merger of the pre-existing Reserves Division and Under 18 Division, in order to aid player development on the territory. Competing clubs are required to register a reserve squad of 18 players, of which 13 must be Gibraltarian.

Teams

Following the early end to the previous season, Manchester 62 opted not to field an Intermediate team this season, with St Joseph's returning to the league. Boca Gibraltar were initially set to enter the league for the first time, but the revocation of their domestic license in November 2020 meant that the side did not enter. Due to the lack of resources necessary to compete in the new Gibraltar National League, Hound Dogs were granted special permission by the Gibraltar FA to participate as a senior side in the Intermediate League.

Note: Flags indicate national team as has been defined under FIFA eligibility rules. Players may hold more than one non-FIFA nationality.

League table

Results

Note: Glacis United Intermediate vs College 1975 Intermediate originally finished 5–1, before the result was overturned by the GFA. The same happened in the game against Lynx Intermediate, which originally finished 8-3 to Glacis. The match between Bruno's Magpies Intermediate and Glacis United Intermediate, scheduled for 6 May 2021, did not go ahead. Bruno's Magpies Intermediate were awarded a 3–0 win. The match between St Joseph's Intermediate and Lions Gibraltar Intermediate on 14 May was awarded to Lions.

Season statistics

Scoring

Top scorers

Hat-tricks

Clean Sheets

See also
2020–21 Gibraltar National League
2020–21 Gibraltar Women's Football League

References

Intermediate